is a Japanese-American composer and conductor. His works have spanned the concert stage, films, television, video games, and advertising campaigns.

Early life
Furukawa was born in Tokyo, Japan, and raised in the suburbs of Los Angeles after moving to the United States at the age of three. As a child, he studied the piano, then, later on, the viola. Furukawa was inspired to pursue composition after seeing Jurassic Park and hearing  John Williams’ score, and his parents, although non-musical themselves, accorded him to a very privileged music education.

Career
In 2016, Furukawa composed the score for Fumito Ueda’s The Last Guardian. The performance of the soundtrack was conducted by Furukawa with the London Symphony Orchestra, the Trinity Boys Choir, and London Voices, and was recorded at Lyndhurst Hall. On February 16, 2023 it was confirmed that Takeshi Furukawa was attached to the Upcoming live action Avatar the Last Airbender project as its composer.

Works

References

External links 
 
 

Year of birth missing (living people)
21st-century American conductors (music)
21st-century American male musicians
American film score composers
American male conductors (music)
American male film score composers
American television composers
Japanese conductors (music)
Japanese film score composers
Japanese male film score composers
Japanese television composers
Living people
Male television composers
Video game composers